The Indian Business Museum is located in IIM Kozhikode, in the city of Kozhikode, in the state of Kerala, India. It was opened in 2013 and is dedicated to showcasing the rich traditions of Indian Business. The museum intends to collect, consolidate, and conserve the rich business history of India. The museum also seeks to inspire and ignite business entrepreneurship among the youth. To visit the museum, a gate pass of IIMK might be required.

Background
The museum was inaugurated in 2013 by then HRD Minister Palam Raju. The museum intends to inspire budding entrepreneurs by providing the rich trade history of Kozhikode and about business in India. Many business houses, including Tata, Godrej, Reliance, Reserve Bank of India and Infosys, have set up their pavilions inside the museum.

See also
 List of museums in India

References

2013 establishments in Kerala
Museums established in 2013
Industry museums in India
History museums in India
Museums in Kerala
Tourist attractions in Kozhikode
Buildings and structures in Kozhikode
Business museums